The 2017 Just World Indoor Bowls Championship was held at Potters Leisure Resort, Hopton on Sea, Great Yarmouth, England, on 13–29 January 2017.

Paul Foster of Scotland won the open singles to claim his fifth world singles title and Katherine Rednall won her second women's singles crown.

Jason Greenslade of Wales and Les Gillett of England won the Open Pairs whilst Nick Brett and Claire Johnston won the mixed pairs.

Australia's Ellen Ryan became the first female winner of the Open Under 25 Singles.

Winners

Draw and results

Open singles

Women's singles

Open pairs

Mixed pairs

Open Under-25 Singles

References

World Indoor Bowls Championship
2017 in bowls
World Indoor Bowls Championship
International sports competitions hosted by England
World Indoor Bowls Championship
Sport in Great Yarmouth